Olearia megalophylla, commonly known as large-leaf daisy bush, is a species of flowering plant in the family Asteraceae and is endemic to south-eastern continental Australia. It is a spreading shrub with egg-shaped to elliptic leaves and white and yellow, daisy-like inflorescences.

Description
The upper surface of the leaves is dark green and glabrous, the lower surface densely covered with hairs similar to those on the branchlets. Flowering occurs from December to March and the fruit is a more or less glabrous achene, the pappus with 51 to 80 bristles in two rows.

Taxonomy
This daisy bush was first formally described in 1860 by Ferdinand von Mueller who gave it the name Eurybia megalophylla in Papers and Prodeedings of the Royal Society of van Dieman's Land. In 1867, George Bentham changed the name to Olearia megalophylla in Flora Australiensis. The specific epithet (megalophylla) means "large-leaved".

Distribution and habitat
Large-leaf daisy bush grows in forest and woodland on the slopes and tablelands of south from near Orange New South Wales to near Lake Mountain in eastern Victoria.

References

Asterales of Australia
Flora of New South Wales
Flora of Victoria (Australia)
megalophylla
Plants described in 1860
Taxa named by Ferdinand von Mueller